Anna Stephanie Maiwald (born 21 July 1990) is a German athlete who specialises in the heptathlon. In 2008 Maiwald won the heptathlon at the German under 20 championship.

She competed in the heptathlon event at the 2016 European Championships in Amsterdam, Netherlands. Has won the gold medal in the heptathlon at the 2015 Universiade.

Personal bests

Outdoor

Indoor

References

External links 
 

1990 births
Living people
German heptathletes
Universiade medalists in athletics (track and field)
Universiade gold medalists for Germany
Medalists at the 2015 Summer Universiade
Sportspeople from Heidelberg
20th-century German women
21st-century German women